Takoma may refer to:
 Takoma Park, Maryland, a city located in Montgomery County, Maryland
 Takoma, Washington, D.C., a neighborhood in Washington, D.C.
 Takoma (Washington Metro), a stop on the Red Line of the Washington Metro subway system
 Takoma Records, a record label founded by John Fahey
 "Takoma", a song by the American band Bright from the album The Albatross Guest House

See also
Tacoma (disambiguation)
Tahoma (disambiguation)
Tecoma (disambiguation)